Andrew W. Smith (1879–1960) was a Scottish professional association footballer who played in the Football League for West Bromwich Albion, the Scottish Football League for East Stirlingshire, and the Southern Football League for several clubs.

Career
After spells with East Stirlingshire, Vale of Garron and Stoke, Smith joined West Bromwich Albion in 1900. He made 23 appearances in the Football League, scoring eight times. He had a brief spell with Newton Heath early in 1903, before joining Bristol Rovers the same year. He scored 35 goals in 70 appearances for Rovers.

While at Bristol Rovers he won a Southern League title in the 1904–05 season, when he was also the division's top goalscorer. He then had spells with Millwall Athletic, Swindon Town and Leyton, before re-joining Rovers in 1908.

He ended his career in the midlands, playing firstly for Wednesbury Old Athletic, then finally Brierley Hill Alliance. After finishing his footballing career he returned to his native Scotland, where he worked in a steel factory and as a docker. He died in Glasgow in 1960.

Career statistics
Source:

References

1879 births
Date of birth missing
1960 deaths
Date of death missing
Footballers from Falkirk (council area)
Scottish footballers
Association football forwards
East Stirlingshire F.C. players
Stoke City F.C. players
West Bromwich Albion F.C. players
Manchester United F.C. players
Bristol Rovers F.C. players
Millwall F.C. players
Swindon Town F.C. players
Leyton F.C. players
Wednesbury Old Athletic F.C. players
Brierley Hill Alliance F.C. players
Scottish Football League players
English Football League players
Southern Football League players